Ktsarim (Shorts) was an Israeli sketch comedy series broadcast on Channel 2.

History
Ktzarim was  based on the British comedy show The Sketch Show. The show debuted in 2004 and is similar to Israeli satirical sketch shows, like Eretz Nehederet and Zehu Ze!. It is composed of a series of sketches, often with a punch line at the end.

Cast 
The show features: 
 Moni Moshonov (מוני מושונוב)
 Keren Mor (קרן מור)
 Shmulik Levy (שמוליק לוי) 
 Riki Blich (ריקי בליך)
 Yuval Segal (יובל סגל)

References

External links
Official website 

Israeli television series
Television sketch shows
Channel 2 (Israeli TV channel) original programming
2004 Israeli television series debuts
2009 Israeli television series endings
2000s Israeli television series